Wilks is a surname which may refer to:

People
 Alan Wilks (born 1946), English footballer
 Bobby Wilks (1931–2009), US Coast Guard aviator, first African-American to reach the rank of Coast Guard captain
 Brian Wilks (born 1966), NHL hockey player 
 Clement Wilks (1819–1871), Australian civil engineer
 Christine Wilks (born 1960), British digital artist and writer
 Dan and Farris Wilks, American businessmen
 Eileen Wilks (born 1952), American author
 George Wilks (born 1908), British former motorcycle speedway rider
 Guy Wilks (born 1981), British rally driver
 Hector Wilks (born 1919), English botanist
 Ivor Wilks (born 1928), British historian
 James Wilks (born 1978), English mixed martial arts fighter
 Jim Wilks (born 1958), American former National Football League player 
 John Wilks (1776–1854), English Member of Parliament
 Jonathan Wilks (born 1967), British ambassador
 Mark Wilks (born 1760), Manx soldier
 Maurice Wilks (1904–1963), British car designer
 Mike Wilks (author) (born 1947), English artist, illustrator and author
 Mike Wilks (basketball) (born 1979), American basketball player
 Robert Wilks (c.1665–1732), British actor and theatrical manager
 Samuel S. Wilks, American mathematician and statistician
 Samuel Wilks (born 1827), British physician
 Steven Wilks (born 1969), American football coach and former player
 Suzie Wilks (born 1970), Australian TV celebrity
 Ted Wilks (1915–1989), American baseball player
 Terrell Wilks (born 1989), American sprinter
 William Wilks (1843–1923), British horticulturalist
 William Wilks (Australian politician) (1863?–1940)
 Yorick Wilks (born 1939), British computer scientist

Fictional characters
 Henry Wilks, in the Emmerdale soap opera

See also
 Wilkes (surname)
 Wilk, surname
 Martin v. Wilks
 Wilks Coefficient
 Wilks' lambda distribution

Surnames from given names